Antonín Dvořák's String Quartet No. 8. in E major, Op. 80 (B. 57), is a chamber composition, written between 20 January and 4 February 1876 in Prague.

The work, originally marked as Op. 27, was composed shortly after finishing the Piano Trio in G minor, Op. 26, and before the beginning of the sketchings for the Stabat Mater cantata.

The quartet was published in 1888 by Fritz Simrock in Berlin as Op. 80, although Dvořák protested. The first performance took place on 29 December 1890 at the concert of the Joachim Quartet in Berlin, played by Joachim, Hegemeister, Wirth and Diepert.

Structure 
The composition consists of four movements:

The recent loss of Dvořák's second child is apparent in his works from this period. The quartet, like the Stabat Mater and Piano Trio No. 2, is sad and nostalgic. Although nominally in a major key, themes are often presented in a minor key. The expression of melancholy and sorrow is apparent throughout the work.

A typical performance lasts about 28 minutes.

Recordings 
Dvořák: Chamber Works Vol. 6. CD Supraphon. 11 1456-2 131. (Panocha Quartet)

Footnotes

References 
Antonín Dvořák: Smyčcový kvartet E dur, Op. 80. (Score) Prague: SNKLHU, 1956. H 1835

External links 
String Quartet No. 8 on a comprehensive Dvorak site

Dvorak 08
1876 compositions
Compositions in E major